Mes héros is a 2012 French comedy-drama directed by Éric Besnard.

Plot
Maxime is the overwhelmed boss of an ambulance company. Deceived by his wife, he refuses to forgive her, then learns that his mother Olga, a woman of strong character who refuses submission and to accept the world as it is, is in custody after defending another woman in a brawl. He travels to Bordeaux to get her out of jail. Olga tells Maxime that his father Jacques' medical reports are not looking good. On the way back home, Olga diverts the route to rescue the black boy Tiemoko, son of an African deportee without papers, to hide in their home away from authorities. Maxime takes the opportunity to spend a few days with his parents, away from his occupational and marital troubles. Despite the quarrels of his parents, he sees his mother's concern for his father, who is jovial & enjoys good wine and cigarettes banned by his wife, & wishes for the same in his own marriage. The son rediscovers the feelings of love and generosity between his parents, his "heroes" who provide a model with which to overcome his own problems. The small Tiemoko just cements this family relations.

Cast

 Josiane Balasko as Olga
 Gérard Jugnot as Jacques
 Clovis Cornillac as Maxime
 Pierre Richard as Jean
 Ibrahim Burama Darboe as Tiemoko
 Anne Charrier as Stéphanie
 Michelle Goddet as Nicole
 Magaly Berdy as Sally
 Michel Masiero as Roger
 Constance Dollé as Isabelle
 Sarah Suco as The waitress

Production
This movie is the reunion between the two members of Le Splendid, Josiane Balasko and Gérard Jugnot.

References

External links

2012 films
2012 comedy-drama films
French comedy-drama films
2010s French-language films
Films directed by Éric Besnard
2010s French films